Wilson Pickett in Philadelphia is the eleventh studio album by singer Wilson Pickett released in 1970. After cutting many of his earlier albums in the Deep South (Memphis and Muscle Shoals), Pickett headed to Philadelphia to work with Gamble and Huff. The album features two of Pickett's most popular singles from the early 1970s - "Engine No. 9" (#14 Pop, #3 R&B) and "Don't Let the Green Grass Fool You" (#17 Pop, #2 R&B).

Track listing
"Run Joey Run" (Kenny Gamble, Leon Huff)	2:37	
"Help The Needy" (Bobby Eli)	2:31	
"Come Right Here" (Victor Drayton, Reginald Turner)	2:35	
"Bumble Bee (Sting Me)" (Victor Drayton, Bunny Sigler, Reginald Turner)	2:13	
"Don't Let The Green Grass Fool You" (Jerry Akines, Johnny Bellman; Drayton, Turner)	2:46	
"Get Me Back On Time, Engine Number 9 (Part I)" (Gamble, Huff)	2:46	
"Get Me Back On Time, Engine Number 9 (Part II) (Gamble, Huff) 3:37	
"Days Go By" (Ugene Dozier, Bunny Sigler)	2:24	
"International Playboy" (Bernard Broomer, Ugene Dozier, Lee Phillips, Bunny Sigler)    2:26	
"Ain't No Doubt About It" (Kenny Gamble, Leon Huff)	2:19

Personnel
Wilson Pickett - lead vocals
Vincent Montana Jr. - vibraphone, percussion
Ronnie Baker - bass
Thom Bell - organ
Earl Young - drums
Bobby Eli, Norman Harris, Roland Chambers - guitar
Gene Dozier, Lenny Pakula - keyboards, piano
Sam Reed & His Horn Section - horns
Don Renaldo & His String Section - strings

Charts
The album reached number 12 on the soul albums chart in the United States. "Engine Number 9" charted at number 14 on the Billboard Hot 100 and number 3 on the R&B Singles chart. "Don't Let the Green Grass Fool You" charted at number 17 on the Hot 100 and number 2 on the R&B chart.

Singles

References

External links
 Wilson Pickett-In Philadelphia at Discogs

1970 albums
Wilson Pickett albums
Albums produced by Kenneth Gamble
Albums produced by Leon Huff
Albums arranged by Bobby Martin
Albums recorded at Sigma Sound Studios
Atlantic Records albums